The Blackburn T.4 Cubaroo was a prototype British biplane torpedo bomber of the 1920s. Built by Blackburn Aircraft and intended to carry a large 21 in (533 mm) torpedo, the Cubaroo was one of the largest single-engined aircraft in the world at the time of its first flight.

Design and development
In 1921, the British Air Ministry issued Specification 8/21 to Blackburn for a Coastal Defence Torpedo Aeroplane, the resulting design being the T.4 Cubaroo. Major F. A Bumpus, chief designer of Blackburn Aircraft submitted the design for the Blackburn T.4 Cubaroo, which was a large biplane powered by a single example of the new 1,000 hp (750 kW) Napier Cub engine. Avro also submitted a design against this specification, the Avro 557 Ava, which was a similarly large biplane, powered by two 600 hp (450 kW) Rolls-Royce Condor engines.

To carry the heavy (over 2,000 lb/907 kg) torpedo over a long range, the Cubaroo was massive. The Cubaroo, with a mainly metal structure, had a deep fuselage to accommodate the Cub engine and was fitted with folding, two-bay wings. To carry the torpedo, the Cubaroo was fitted with a main undercarriage comprising two sets of two wheels, with the torpedo being carried on a crutch between them.

Operational history
The first prototype (with serial N166) flew in secrecy in the summer of 1924, proving to have good handling characteristics, with the engine not causing problems (the Cub had already been test flown in an Avro Aldershot testbed). It was then fitted with a metal, three-blade adjustable-pitch propeller and was delivered for testing at RAF Martlesham Heath but was written off after its undercarriage collapsed on 2 February 1925. A second prototype flew in 1925, but the Air Ministry abandoned the requirement for a torpedo bomber to carry the 21 in (533 mm) torpedo and lost interest in single-engine heavy bombers, so the second prototype Cubaroo was used as an engine testbed, flying with the experimental 1,100 hp (820 kW) Beardmore Simoon compression ignition engine.

Operators

 Royal Air Force operated aircraft for evaluation and as a testbed only.

Specifications (Cubaroo)

See also

References

Further reading

External links

  

Cubaroo
1920s British bomber aircraft
Single-engined tractor aircraft
Biplanes
Cancelled military aircraft projects of the United Kingdom
Aircraft first flown in 1924